Swanlike is the first album by German progressive metal band Dark Suns. It is their only album to employ death vocals.  It was originally self-released, but on February 21, 2005 it was re-released through Prophecy Productions, with a bonus track. The bonus track, "Suffering", was a rewritten version of the band's 1999 demo, Suffering the Psychopathic Results of Daily Blasphemy.

Track listing

Credits
 Niko Knappe - vocals, drums
 Maik Knappe - Guitars
 Torsten Wenzel - Guitars
 Christoph Bormann - Bass
 Thomas Bremer - keyboards

References 

2002 albums
Dark Suns albums